Fron is a small village in Powys, Wales, within the community of Llanbadarn Fawr. Fron lies northeast of Llandrindod Wells and east of Clywedog Brook, which flows into the River Ithon.

Fron is served by Pen-y-Bont railway station.

Villages in Powys